Federal Airport Act of 1946 is United States statute establishing a federal program for the development of civil aviation airports within the continental United States. The Act of Congress authorized federal grants to progressively evolve civil aviation bases. The public law mandates a national airport plan encompassing airport classifications as defined by the Civil Aeronautics Administration.

The Senate legislation was passed by the 79th United States Congressional session and enacted into law by the 33rd President of the United States Harry Truman on May 13, 1946.

Provisions of the Act
The government financed air transportation law was drafted as nineteen sections commissioning a national construction and development plan for domestic airports throughout the United States.

Amendments to 1946 Act
U.S. Congressional amendments to the Federal Airport Act.

See also

Aeronautical chart
Airport and Airway Development Act of 1970
Airport Improvement Program
Federal Aviation Act of 1958
List of Class B airports in the United States
List of Class C airports in the United States
Post-war aviation
Runway

Bibliography

External links
 
 
 
 
 

1946 in law
1946 in American law
1946 in aviation
79th United States Congress
United States federal transportation legislation
Aviation law